Hold That Blonde is a 1945 American comedy film directed by George Marshall. It stars Eddie Bracken and Veronica Lake.

Plot
Bracken plays a kleptomaniac who unwittingly becomes involved with a gang of jewel thieves, including a beautiful woman, Sally, whom he promptly falls in love with, initially unaware of her true occupation.

Cast
Eddie Bracken as Ogden Spencer Trulow III 
Veronica Lake as Sally Martin
Albert Dekker as Insp Callahan
Frank Fenton as Mr. Phillips
George Zucco as Dr. Paval Storasky
Donald MacBride as Mr. Kratz
Lewis Russell as Henry Carteret
Norma Varden as Mrs. Carteret
Willie Best as Willie
Jack Norton as the drunk
Lyle Latell as Tony

Production
The film was originally known as Good Intentions.

Officially it is a remake of Paths to Paradise, a 1925 silent comedy starring Raymond Griffith, inasmuch as both are based on the same play, Heart of a Thief by Paul Armstrong. However, the storyline was almost entirely reworked, to the extent that the two films have almost nothing in common apart from a few sight gags and a party sequence in which a valuable necklace is the target of the thieves.

The movie was originally offered to Bob Hope, then under contract to Paramount. He refused to do it unless he could make one film per year outside Paramount. The studio refused and Hope was put on suspension. The part was given instead to Eddie Bracken. (Hope and Paramount would eventually resolve their differences and sign a new seven-year contract.)

Filming started 20 November 1944. The part was a favorite of Lake's because it represented a change of pace for her ("it's a comedy, rather what Carole Lombard used to do") and she liked working with George Marshall, calling him "splendid... he's lots of fun, acts out the scenes himself," she said.

Reception
Diabolique said "this is the sort of movie that should have been great fun but just isn’t; Bracken flails about, Lake is dull and lacking sexiness, and together they lack the chemistry of, say, Bob Hope and Paulette Goddard."

References

External links

1945 films
Films directed by George Marshall
American comedy films
1945 comedy films
American black-and-white films
Paramount Pictures films
1940s American films